No. 661 Squadron AAC is a squadron of the British Army's Army Air Corps (AAC).

The squadron was reformed from the original RAF squadron on 1 November 1978 while in Germany.

See also

 List of Army Air Corps aircraft units

References

Citations

Bibliography

External links

 661 Squadron entry at helis.com

Army Air Corps aircraft squadrons